This is a list of Cape Verde national football team games from 1978 to 1999.

1998 games

References

1998